Elk City is an unincorporated city in Lincoln County, in the U.S. state of Oregon. Lying along the Yaquina River east of Newport, it is on Elk City Road off U.S. Route 20 at Toledo. Ocean tides affect the water levels this far upriver.

Name
Named for the creek, Elk City was "said to have been the first settlement in what is now 'Lincoln County'." A post office was established at this location, then called Newton, in 1868. In 1888, the name was changed from Newton to Elk City. The Elk City post office closed in 1958.

History
The Corvallis and Yaquina Wagon Road Company established Elk City in 1866 by building a warehouse with a store and by laying out a town. A year later, Elk City had a second store, a hotel, and a structure doubling as a church and schoolhouse. Boats regularly ascended the river to Elk City, the last stop on the overland mail route of the time, and delivered mail downriver by water.

In the late 19th century, Elk City was one of the stops on the Oregon Pacific Railroad, linking the former port city of Yaquina to Corvallis and Albany. After the Oregon Pacific failed financially, fell into receivership, and went through 17 years of financial and legal complications, it became a branch line of the Southern Pacific in 1907.

Efforts to restore a covered bridge over the Yaquina River at Elk City fell short in 1981. Fund-raising for repairs had produced $20,000, and restoration had begun when high winds caused another $90,000 damage to the structure. The county did not have enough money to pay for restoration or to pursue an insurance settlement through the courts. The original bridge, built by the county in 1922, was a  Howe truss span supported by wooden pilings that suffered from rot.  And then in August 2016 a new property owner arrived. His name is Jim Salisbury, Jim purchased the old Elk City Grange.  The grange was a neighborhood gathering spot for many years.  However, the Grange has fallen into dis-repair.  Jim was born in Newport in 1956 and starting fishing at Bevens Hole, very close to the Grange back in the early 1960s. Over the years he watched sadly as the Grange fell into disrepair. Not one to stand idly by a piece of history as it slowly crumbled to the ground, Jim devised a plan to buy and lovingly restore the old gathering spot to its former glory. Jim has many grandiose plans for the Grange, including converting a portion of it to a private residence.

River park
Elk City Park, operated by Lincoln County, is in Elk City. The  area has 12 campsites, parking, day-use areas, and a boat launch. Elk City Park is open all year, but the campground and restrooms are closed from November to March.

Footnotes

Unincorporated communities in Lincoln County, Oregon
Unincorporated communities in Oregon